Far From Home is a 2022 young adult home series produced by Netflix also doubles as first Netflix Nigerian young adult TV series. The series written by Dami Elebe and produced by Inkblot productions premiered on Netflix on 16 December 2022. The five-part series stars Mike Afolarin, Richard Mofe-Damijo, Bimbo Akintola, Carol King, Adesua Etomi, Funke Akindele, Bolanle Ninalowo, Genoveva Umeh, Natse Jemide and a host of others.

Synopsis 
‘Far From Home’ is the story of Ishaya, a charismatic teenager and talented artist from a poor family whose dreams are suddenly realized when he receives a prestigious scholarship to the country’s most exclusive school, catapulting him into the luxurious world of Nigeria’s elite. Meanwhile, a huge secret threatens his newfound status and, ultimately, the safety of his family.

Ishaya Bello (Mike Afolarin), is a talented but poor teenager struggling to pursue his dream of becoming an artist. Luck shines on him when he stumbles on the rare opportunity to win a scholarship to the elite Wilmer Academy, although he is only interested in using the scholarship grant to fund his trip to London where he has been offered an apprenticeship with established artist Essien (Deyemi Okanlawon). After his mother Patricia (Funke Akindele) spends his hard-earned savings on her ailing husband Ishaya Senior (Paul Adams) without their son's consent, thus putting paid to his ambition, Ishaya steals from the nightclub where he works as a waiter. To avoid being murdered by cartel boss Oga Rambo (Bolanle Ninalowo), he offers to peddle MDMA to the Wilmer students, although once again he is nearly killed for using Rambo's second-in-command Government's (Bucci Franklin) supply. While masquerading as a student, Ishaya's illicit manoeuvring leads to further chaos in Wilmer, at home, and within the cartel hierarchy. After his sister is kidnapped by Rambo's gang, they carry out a similar move with Ishaya's school friend, Frank (Emeka Nwagbaraocha), which leaves him traumatised. Rambo then attacks Wilmer Academy, which leads to more trouble for Ishaya and his family.

Selected cast 

 Mike Afolarin as Ishaya Bello
 Elma Mbadiwe as Carmen Wilmer-Willoughby
 Genoveva Umeh as Zina
 Bolanle Ninalowo as Oga Rambo
 Bucci Franklin as Government
 Natse Jemide as Reggie
 Richard Mofe-Damijo as Feyi Wilmer-Willoughby
 Bimbo Akintola as Mabel Wilmer-Willoughby
 Funke Akindele as Patricia Bello
 Paul Adams as Ishaya Bello Snr
 Olumide Oworu as Atlas
 Adesua Etomi as Mrs Irurhe
 Tomi Ojo as Rahila
 Linda Ejiofor as Mrs Abubakar
 Carol King as Principal Gemade
 Gbubemi Ejeye as Adufe
 Richard Tanksley as Mr. Boyle
 Deyemi Okanlawon as Essien

Episodes

Production and release 
Far From Home produced by Inkblot Productions is the First Nigerian Young Adult (YA) Netflix Original series also doubles as the first young adult genre coming out of West Africa. The premiere of the movie held in Lagos on 14 December 2022 and it featured host of celebrities in attendance.

References 

English-language Netflix original programming
Nigerian drama television series
Television shows set in Lagos